The 1965 Ball State Cardinals football team was an American football team that represented Ball State University in the Indiana Collegiate Conference (ICC) during the 1965 NCAA College Division football season. In its fourth season under head coach Ray Louthen, the team compiled a 9–0 record in the regular season and played Tennessee A&I to a 14–14 tie in the 1965 Grantland Rice Bowl.

Schedule

References

Ball State
Ball State Cardinals football seasons
College football undefeated seasons
Ball State Cardinals football